Bends is a 2013 Hong Kong drama film written and directed by Flora Lau in her directorial debut. It was screened in the Un Certain Regard section at the 2013 Cannes Film Festival.

Plot
Anna, a wealthy Hong Kong housewife, suddenly finds herself deep in financial trouble as her only source of income, her husband, disappears. Her driver, Fai, who lives in Shenzhen with his wife, are expecting the couple's second child. But under China's One Child Policy, they need to find the money to pay the penalty or the couple must find a way for Fai's wife to give birth in Hong Kong.

Cast
 Carina Lau as Anna
 Chen Kun as Fai
 Tian Yuan as Tingting
 Lawrence Cheng as Leo
 Stephanie Che
 Elena Kong
 Tony Ho

Critical reception
Maggie Lee of Variety wrote, "Flora Lau's debut is beautifully assembled by a top-pedigree production crew, but it remains a modest accomplishment in scope and impact."

Andrea Lo of HK Magazine gave the film 4 stars out of 5. She wrote, "The film is topical and emotionally fraught for all of us in Hong Kong, posing questions of wealth and status between our city and the mainland: questions that are on all our minds."

Awards
Chen Kun won the Best Actor Award at the 2013 International du Film de Femmes de Sale in Morocco. Carina Lau won the Best Actress Award at the 2014 Osaka Asian Film Festival.

References

External links
 
 

2013 films
2013 directorial debut films
2013 drama films
2010s Cantonese-language films
2010s English-language films
2010s Hong Kong films
2010s Mandarin-language films
English-language Hong Kong films
Films set in Shenzhen
Hong Kong drama films
Hong Kong multilingual films